Paranotoreas fulva  is a species of moth in the family Geometridae. This species is endemic to New Zealand. It is classified as "At Risk, Relict" by the Department of Conservation.

Taxonomy
This species was first described and illustrated by George Vernon Hudson in 1905 and was given the name Lythria fulva. Hudson used a specimen collected at about 3500 ft at Wedderburn, Central Otago by J. H. Lewis. Hudson discussed and illustrated this species in his 1928 book The Butterflies and Moths of New Zealand under the name Notoreas fulva. In 1986 Robin C. Craw proposed placing this species within the genus Paranotoreas. The lectotype specimen, collected at Wedderburn, is held at the Museum of New Zealand Te Papa Tongarewa.

Description

Hudson described the species as follows:

This species varies in depth of colouring on its fore and hind wings with some female specimens being extremely pale and having forewings that are coloured reddish-ochreous.

Distribution
This species is endemic to New Zealand. As well as the type locality, this species has also been found in Alexandra. P. fulva also occurs in the Manorburn Ecological District, as well as at Pisa Flats, Chapman Road Scientific Reserve, Springvale Junction, Moa Creek and other sites in Otago and South Canterbury.

Life cycle and behaviour

The adults of this species are day flying. Adults have been recorded on the wing in March, October and December.  They are known to sunbath on the bare salt pan soil of their favoured habitat.

Habitat and host species

This species occurs in the salt pans of Otago, as well as at tussock grassland areas of montane South Canterbury. This species has also been collected on glacial outwash terraces south of Tekapo. Atriplex buchananii and Plantago coronopus have been recorded as the larval host plants of this species. Larvae of P. fulva have been reared on Stellaria gracilenta and species in the genera Crepis and Hieracium.

Conservation status
This moth is classified under the New Zealand Threat Classification system as being "At Risk, Relict". This species is under threat as a result of loss of habitat upon which it relies.

References

External links
Image of lectotype specimen

Larentiinae
Moths of New Zealand
Endemic fauna of New Zealand
Endangered biota of New Zealand
Moths described in 1905
Taxa named by George Hudson
Endemic moths of New Zealand